The Ulsan Munsu Football Stadium, nicknamed Big Crown Stadium,  is a football stadium in Ulsan in South Korea. It is home to the Ulsan Hyundai FC.

The stadium was built from 18 December 1998 to 28 April 2001 and its total cost was 151.4 billion won (US$116.5 million).

Located in a major industrial city, the Ulsan Munsu football Stadium contains both mechanical and environment-friendly imagery. The overall shape of the stadium is in the shape of skull crown that symbolizes Silla and Bangudae Petroglyphs. The stadium has three floors and 2 basement floors and a seating capacity of 44,102. There is also an auxiliary stadium with 2,590 seats. Next to the stadium is Munsu Park with a lake, a fountain and bicycle courses, lakeside square. It replaced Ulsan Complex Stadium. The venue hosted several 2002 FIFA World Cup matches.

International matches
2002 FIFA World Cup

See also
Sport in South Korea
List of sports venues in South Korea
List of South Korean tourist attractions

References

External links

 Official Site 
 Ulsan Sports Facilities Management Center 
 Ulsan Hyundai FC Official Site 
 Stadium picture
 World Stadiums

Ulsan Hyundai FC
Venues of the 2002 Asian Games
Asian Games football venues
2002 FIFA World Cup stadiums in South Korea
2001 FIFA Confederations Cup stadiums in South Korea
Football venues in South Korea
Sports venues in Ulsan
Sports venues completed in 2001
K League 1 stadiums